Golnar Servatian (also Romanized as "Golnār Servatiān", ; born 1977 in Tabriz) is an Iranian cartoonist and book illustrator.

Biography 
Golnar Servatian was born in 1977 in Tabriz, East Azerbaijan Province, Iran. Her father, Behrouz Servatian, was a professor of the Persian language and literature. She began her career as Graphic designer and Cartoonist in 2006.
She has spent most of her time focusing on illustrating children’s books and magazines, and has done this professionally since 2006. She has illustrated about 50 books for children and worked with different  publishers inside Iran. Painting, writing stories and poems are a kind of hobby for her.

Career 
Servatian won the jury award in the competition with Brazil, Russia, Finland, Poland, Turkey, Mexico, and Italy at the Biennial Cartoon and Imagination Festival in China.
She also won the 2016 "Berlin Audience Award and Certificate" of "7th International Cartoon Competition".
Golnar Servatian was among the three Iranian illustrators whose works, along with works by other artists from France, Italy, Mexico, and the United States, were featured at the 16th Italy Teatrio Imagery Exhibition.

Festivals and awards 
 Audience Award and Certificate of "7th International Cartoon Competition", Berlin, 2016
 Selected title of "The International Eskişehir Cartoon Festival", Turkey, 2016
 Second rank at "1st International Festival of Muhammad, Prophet of Kindness" 2015
 First rank at "Poster Design at Shour and Sho'oor Festival, 2013
 First grade of "Linocut Print" in country level in the "14th Festival of Visual Arts", Hamedan, Iran, 2012
 First grade of "Linocut Print" in country level in the "13th Festival of Visual Arts", Kerman, Iran, 2011
 Selected title of "4th International Exhibition of Humorous Drawings on Sport", Fossano, Italy, 2011
 Selected title of The "International Illustration Contest" the Cannonball Lady, Teatrio, Italy, 2011
 Selected prize in "Master Cup International Cartoon and Illustration Biennial", China, 2007
 Selected title at the "Belgrade Biennial of Illustrations", Belgrade, Yugoslavia, 2007
 Third rank at "First Festival of Card Postal Creation of Academic Jihad Art Branch", 2007
 Acceptance of illustration in "Illustration Exhibition of 200th Annual of Hans Christian Andersen", 2005
 Honorary diploma at the "Second Festival of Text-Book Illustration", Tehran, 2005
 Second rank of illustration in country level at the "8th Festival of Visual Arts", 2005
 Honorary diploma at the "1st Festival of Primary Text-Books Illustration", Tehran, 2004
 First grade of illustration in country level at the "6th Festival of Visual Arts", 2003

Publications

Persian 
Servatian has written and illustrated more than 40 children books and magazines. Among her books as creator (writer and illustrator) are these Persian books:

 Mūrcheh [Ant], Tehran: Mashgh-e Honar, 2012
 Būzīneh [Ape], Tehran: Mashgh-e Honar, 2012
 Parvāneh [Butterfly], Tehran: Mashgh-e Honar, 2012
 Gāv [Cow], Tehran: Mashgh-e Honar, 2012
 Efrīt va Bāzargān [Demon and the Merchant], Tehran: Mashgh-e Honar, 2012
 Fīl-hā va Parastū-hā [Elephants and Swallows], Tehran: Mashgh-e Honar, 2012
 Golparī, Tehran: Mashgh-e Honar, 2012
 Hodhod [Hoopoe], Tehran: Mashgh-e Honar, 2012
 Mār [Snake], Tehran: Mashgh-e Honar, 2012
 Ankabūt [Spider], Tehran: Mashgh-e Honar, 2012
 Nahang [Whale], Tehran: Mashgh-e Honar, 2012
 Māhi-e Kūchūlū-ye Sargashte [The Little Bewildered Fish], translated by Shima Yazdi, illustrated by Golnar Servatian, Tehran: Shazde Kocholo Publications, 2019

She has been a co-author of these Persian secondary school textbooks:
 Tarrāhi-e Nešāneh, Tasvīrgari-e Ketāb-e Kūdak va Nezārat-e Čāp [Designing Signs, Children's Books Illustration and Print Supervision], a textbook for the 11th-graders, Technical and Professional Branch: Art Group, Photo-Graphic, Tehran: The Organization for Research and Educational Planning, 2017 (2nd impression: 2018), Chapter III, pp. 79–140
 Rāhnamā-ye Honarāmūz; Tarrāhi-e Nešāneh, Tasvīrgari-e Ketāb-e Kūdak va Nezārat bar Čāp [Tutorial Guide; Designing Signs, Children's Books Illustration and Print Supervision], a textbook for the 11th-graders, Technical and Professional Branch: Art Group, Photo-Graphic, Tehran: The Organization for Research and Educational Planning, 2017

English 
 Our Colorful World, USA: Prolance Book Publishing, 2020
Servatian has also illustrated the books:

 My First Muslim Potty Book, written by Yousfa Janjua, USA: Prolance Book Publishing, 2020
 A Horse Named Horace: One of a Kind, written by Nayera Salam, USA: Prolance Book Publishing, 2021

References

External links 
 Official website
 AnimalCartoon.net

Iranian painters
Iranian caricaturists
Iranian graphic designers
Iranian cartoonists
Iranian sculptors
Iranian watercolourists
Iranian women painters
Iranian children's book illustrators
Iranian women illustrators
Living people
1977 births
20th-century Iranian painters
21st-century Iranian painters
People from Tabriz
Women watercolorists